Arleigh Albert Burke (October 19, 1901 – January 1, 1996) was an admiral of the United States Navy who distinguished himself during World War II and the Korean War, and who served as Chief of Naval Operations during the Eisenhower and Kennedy administrations.

, the lead ship of its class of Aegis-equipped guided missile destroyers, was commissioned in Burke's honor in 1991.  The honor of naming a US naval vessel after a living figure was only the fourth time it had been bestowed since 1861.

Early life and naval career

Burke was born in Boulder, Colorado, on October 19, 1901, to Oscar Burke and Clara Mokler. His grandfather, August Björkgren, was a Swedish immigrant to the US and changed his surname to 'Burke', a common Irish surname, to sound more 'American'. Due to the 1918 influenza outbreak, schools were closed in Boulder and he never graduated from high school. Burke won an alternate appointment to the United States Naval Academy given by his local congressman. During his time at the Academy, Burke was a member of 23rd Company. He graduated from the Academy in June 1923, and was commissioned as an ensign in the United States Navy. He married Roberta Gorsuch (1899–1997) of Washington, D.C.

Over the next 18 years, Burke served aboard battleships and destroyers, and earned a Master of Science degree in chemical engineering at the University of Michigan in 1931. When World War II came, he found himself, to his great disappointment, in a shore billet at the Naval Gun Factory in Washington, D.C. After persistent efforts on his part, in 1943 he received orders to join the fighting in the South Pacific.

World War II
Burke spent the remainder of the war in the South Pacific. He successively commanded Destroyer Division 43, Destroyer Division 44, Destroyer Squadron 12, and Destroyer Squadron 23. DesRon 23, known as the "Little Beavers", covered the initial landings in Bougainville in November 1943, and fought in 22 separate engagements during the next four months. During this time, the Little Beavers were credited with destroying one Japanese cruiser, nine destroyers, one submarine, several smaller ships, and approximately 30 aircraft. Burke's standing orders to his task force were, "Destroyers to attack on enemy contact WITHOUT ORDERS from the task force commander." After reviewing the Navy's early unsuccessful engagements with the Japanese, he concluded that uncertainty and hesitation had cost them dearly. The lesson was driven home to him at the Battle of Blackett Strait, when his radar operator made first contact with a ship near the shore but Burke hesitated to fire. A battle soon unfolded which ended in a US victory, which only Burke was unhappy with. Reflecting on the events Burke asked a nearby ensign what the difference was between a good officer and a poor one. After listening to the ensign's response, Burke offered his own: "The difference between a good officer and a poor one," said Burke, "is about ten seconds."

His nickname was "31 Knot Burke," originally a taunt, later a popular symbol of his hard-charging nature. An alternative explanation is provided by Jean Edward Smith in his biography of Eisenhower: "During World War Two, Burke mistakenly led his destroyer squadron into a Japanese minefield. Admiral Halsey radioed to ask what he was doing in a Japanese minefield. ‘Thirty-one knots,’ replied Burke”.

In March 1944, Burke was promoted to Chief of Staff to the Commander of Task Force 58, the Fifth Fleet's Fast Carrier Task Force, which was commanded by Admiral Marc Mitscher. The transfer stemmed from a directive from the Chief of Naval Operations, Admiral Ernest King, that required a surface commander such as Admiral Raymond A. Spruance to have an aviator as Chief of Staff, and an air commander, such as Mitscher, to have a surface officer as Chief of Staff. Neither Mitscher nor Burke were happy with the arrangement, but as time passed Burke realized he had been given one of the most important assignments in the Navy, and his hard work and diligence eventually warmed Mitscher to him. Burke was promoted to the temporary rank of Commodore, and participated in all the force's naval engagements until June 1945, near the end of the war. He was aboard both  and  when they were hit by Japanese kamikaze aircraft during the Okinawa campaign.

After the end of the war, Burke reverted to his permanent rank of captain and continued his naval career by serving in a number of capacities, including once more as Admiral Mitscher's chief of staff, until the latter's death in 1947. Burke then took command of the cruiser  for a cruise down the east coast of Africa. He was promoted to rear admiral in 1949 and served as Navy Secretary on the Defense Research and Development Board.

Korean War
At the outbreak of the Korean War, Admiral Forrest Sherman, then Chief of Naval Operations, ordered Burke to duty as Deputy Chief of Staff to Commander Naval Forces Far East. From there, he assumed command of Cruiser Division Five, and, in July 1951, was made a member of the United Nations Truce Delegation which negotiated with the Communists for military armistice in Korea. After six months in the truce tents, he returned to the Office of Chief of Naval Operations where he served as Director of Strategic Plans Division until 1954.

In April 1954, he took command of Cruiser Division Six, then moved in January 1955 to command Destroyer Force Atlantic Fleet (DesLant). In August 1955, Burke succeeded Admiral Robert B. Carney as Chief of Naval Operations. At the time of his appointment as Chief of Naval Operations, Burke was still a rear admiral (two stars) and was promoted over the heads of many Flag Officers who were senior to him. Burke had never served as a vice admiral (three stars), so he was promoted two grades at the time of his appointment.

Chief of Naval Operations

Burke took the post of Chief of Naval Operations with significant reservations. He served at a critical time in world history, during the depths of the Cold War. He was relatively young compared to other Flag Officers at the time. He was a hard worker, and seemingly tireless, working fifteen-hour work days six days a week as a norm.

He was also an excellent leader and manager, and his ability to create an effective organization were keys to his success. He supported the notoriously demanding Admiral Hyman Rickover in the development of a nuclear-powered submarine force, and instituted the development of submarine-launched ballistic missiles, which led to the Polaris missile program, headed by Burke's selectee Rear Admiral W. F. "Red" Raborn. Burke convened the Project Nobska anti-submarine warfare conference in 1956 at the suggestion of Columbus Iselin II, director of the Woods Hole Oceanographic Institution, where discussion ranged from oceanography to nuclear weapons. At the conference, a statement by Edward Teller that a physically small one-megaton warhead suitable for Polaris could be developed led to Burke's adoption of Polaris over Jupiter. At a time when others in the Navy were very skeptical of the idea of a missile launched from a submarine, Burke succeeded in developing the single most effective deterrent to a nuclear attack on the United States. By 1961 routine Polaris deterrent patrols were in progress and a rapid construction program of Polaris submarines was underway.

Burke as Chief of Naval Operations was intimately involved in the Eisenhower administration discussions on limiting the size of the submarine force. Asked "how much is enough?", as to the number of US ballistic missile submarines needed for deterrence, Burke argued that a force of around 40 Polaris submarines (each with 16 missiles) was a reasonable answer. Burke further argued that land-based missiles and bombers were vulnerable to attack, which made the U.S.-Soviet nuclear balance dangerously unstable. By contrast, nuclear submarines were virtually undetectable and invulnerable. He was very critical of "hair trigger" or "launch on warning" nuclear strategies, and he warned that such strategies were "dangerous for any nation."

Burke served an unprecedented three terms as Chief of Naval Operations during a period of growth and progress in the Navy. Upon completing his third term, he was transferred to the Retired List on August 1, 1961.

Last years
Burke, himself of Swedish descent, was the senior representative of the United States of America at the funeral of King Gustaf VI Adolf of Sweden in 1973.

Arleigh Burke died on January 1, 1996, at the National Naval Medical Center in Bethesda, Maryland. He was 94 years old. He is buried at the United States Naval Academy Cemetery, in Annapolis, Maryland.

Awards and honors

Ship class namesake

, the lead ship of her class of Aegis-equipped guided missile destroyers, was commissioned in his honor in 1991. In 1985, a few months after the ship was ordered, an early keel-laying ceremony was held at Bath Iron Works. Burke marked his initials on material that was later incorporated at the physical keel-laying on December 6, 1988. Burke was one of the very few individuals to be honored by a ship named after them during their lifetime.

The Assisted Living section of the Vinson Hall Retirement Community in McLean, Virginia, is named the Arleigh Burke Pavilion in his honor.

Medals

Burke received numerous combat awards during his forty-two years in the Navy, including the Navy Cross, Navy Distinguished Service Medal, Legion of Merit, and the Purple Heart. None were more cherished than two awards that came early in his career. In 1928, while serving aboard , he was commended for the "rescue of shipwrecked and seafaring men." In 1939 during his first command, he was commended when his destroyer won the fleet gunnery trophy with the highest score in many years. His ship also stood third in engineering competition and high in communication competition.

For his service in Destroyer Squadron 23, Burke was awarded the Navy Cross, the Navy Distinguished Service Medal, the Legion of Merit, and the Presidential Unit Citation awarded to the squadron. The citations follow in part:
Navy Cross

Navy Distinguished Service Medal

Legion of Merit

As Chief of Staff, Commander Fast Carrier Task Force, Pacific (Task Force 38), Burke was awarded a Gold Star in lieu of a second Distinguished Service Medal, the Silver Star, a Gold Star in lieu of a second Legion of Merit, and a Letter of Commendation, with authorization to wear the Commendation Ribbon. The citations follow in part:

Silver Star

Gold Star in lieu of second Legion of Merit

Letter of Commendation

From September 1950 until May 1951, Burke served as Deputy Chief of Staff to Commander U.S. Naval Forces, Far East, and, for "exceptionally meritorious conduct (in that capacity) from September 3, 1950, to January 1, 1951" he was awarded a Gold Star in lieu of a third Legion of Merit. The citation further states:

While serving as Commander Cruiser Division Five from May to September 1951, and also as a Member of the Military Armistice Commission in Korea, Burke was awarded an oak leaf cluster in lieu of a fourth Legion of Merit by the Army (Headquarters U.S. Army Forces, Far East) by General Order #5, as follows:

Burke was presented a Gold Star in lieu of a third Distinguished Service Medal by President John F. Kennedy at the White House on July 26, 1961. On January 10, 1977, Burke was presented with the Presidential Medal of Freedom by President Gerald Ford.

Presidential Unit Citations
Those vessels were, at various times during his period of service, flagships of the Fast Carrier Task Forces in the Pacific. The citation for the citation to Destroyer Squadron 23 reads:

Other awards
In addition to the above, Burke earned the American Defense Service Medal with "Fleet" clasp, the Asiatic-Pacific Campaign Medal with two silver stars and two bronze stars (twelve engagements); the American Campaign Medal; World War II Victory Medal; Navy Occupation Service Medal, the National Defense Service Medal with bronze star (Admiral Burke became retroactively eligible for a second award after his retirement); Korean Service Medal with bronze battle star; the Philippine Liberation Medal with bronze service star; and the United Nations Korea Medal. He was awarded the Ui Chi Medal and the Presidential Unit Citation from the Republic of Korea as well as the Order of the Rising Sun, First Class by the Government of Japan. In 1960 he received the Grand Cross of the Royal Norwegian Order of St. Olav from the Norwegian King.  In 1999 Admiral Burke became posthumously eligible for the Korean War Service Medal awarded by the Republic of Korea.

Legacy
In 1962, Burke co-founded the Center for Strategic and International Studies (CSIS) in Washington, D.C., with David Abshire. CSIS hosts the Arleigh A. Burke Chair in Strategy, which "provides political and military analysis of key strategic challenges facing the United States and the world." It is held as of 2013 by Anthony Cordesman.

Burke was elected as an honorary member of the New York State Society of Cincinnati in 1964.

In 1991 Burke was awarded the Lone Sailor Award by the U.S. Navy Memorial Foundation for his distinguished career during World War II and the Korean War.

, a guided-missile destroyer of the United States Navy and lead ship of its class, was named in his honor. The class is one of the most advanced in service and is one of only two destroyer classes currently in active US Navy service.

An elementary school was named in his honor in Boulder; it was closed in 1982. Thunderbird Park, also in Boulder, was renamed Admiral Arleigh A. Burke Memorial Park in 1997. In October 2001, a dedication of the memorial was held, featuring a 12-foot, 26,000-pound anchor from a World War II destroyer, a memorial wall containing a bronze relief sculpture of the admiral and a plaque with his biography.

The Navy annually awards the Arleigh Burke Fleet Trophy to "the ship or aircraft squadron from each coast selected for having achieved the greatest improvement in battle efficiency during the calendar year, based upon the Battle Efficiency Competition." Winning the Battle "E" is not a prerequisite.

The United States Postal Service issued a commemorative stamp pane on February 4, 2010, honoring distinguished sailors. In addition to Burke, the other persons on the stamp pane were Admiral William S. Sims, Lieutenant Commander John McCloy, and Officer's Cook Third Class Doris Miller.

Notes

References

External links

 "Arleigh Burke: The Last CNO" by David Alan Rosenberg – Biographies in Naval History – Naval Historical Center

1901 births
1996 deaths
United States Navy admirals
United States Navy personnel of World War II
United States Navy personnel of the Korean War
Presidential Medal of Freedom recipients
Recipients of the Navy Cross (United States)
Recipients of the Navy Distinguished Service Medal
Recipients of the Legion of Merit
Recipients of the Silver Star
Grand Cordons of the Order of the Rising Sun
United States Naval Academy alumni
Chiefs of Naval Operations
People from Boulder, Colorado
University of Michigan College of Engineering alumni
American people of Swedish descent
Burials at the United States Naval Academy Cemetery
CSIS people
Military personnel from Colorado